Ollainville is a commune in the Vosges department in Grand Est in northeastern France.

Between 1962 and 1999, the registered population declined progressively by nearly 40%.

See also 
 Communes of the Vosges department

References 

Communes of Vosges (department)